Harold Hever (23 June 1895 – 18 July 1958) was an English cricketer. He played seven first-class matches for Kent between 1921 and 1925.

References

External links
 

1895 births
1958 deaths
People from Southborough, Kent
Sportspeople from Kent
English cricketers
Kent cricketers
H. D. G. Leveson Gower's XI cricketers